The Gemmenalphorn is a mountain in the Emmental Alps. It lies north-east of Niederhorn, near Beatenberg

References

External links
 Gemmenalphorn on Hikr

Mountains of the Alps
Mountains of Switzerland
Bernese Alps
Mountains of the canton of Bern
Emmental Alps
Two-thousanders of Switzerland